Viktor K. Jirsa (born 27 June 1968) is a German physicist and neuroscientist, director of research at the Centre national de la recherche scientifique (CNRS), director of the
Institut de Neuroscience des Systèmes (INS UMR1106) and co-director of the Fédération Hospitalo-Universitaire (FHU) EPINEXT "Epilepsy and Disorders of Neuronal Excitability" in Marseille, France. He is workpackage leader in the Epinov project funded in the context of the RHU3 call and coordinated by Fabrice Bartolomei.

Since the late 1990s, Jirsa has made important contributions to the understanding of the link between brain function and network dynamics. He has pioneered the use of biologically realistic connectivity in brain network models of the human and rodent. Applications of this large-scale modeling approach are in resting state activity, epilepsy and aging. Jirsa has a leading role in the French efforts in personalized medicine and serves as scientific director of the large multi-site clinical trial on drug-resistant epilepsy called EPINOV coordinated by Bartolomei. This project represents one of the first translational applications of computational neuroscience in personalized medicine. Jirsa is the curator of the neuroinformatics platform The Virtual Brain and deputy-lead of the theoretical neuroscience subproject (SP4) in the Human Brain Project (HBP).

Education, early career and current position

Jirsa obtained his Master of Science in elementary particle physics from the University of Manchester (UK) in 1991. He then pursued his master studies in philosophy and a diploma in physics (1994), followed by a PhD in theoretical physics (1996) under the supervision of Hermann Haken at the University of Stuttgart, Germany. After two years of post-doctoral training under the mentorship of J. A. Scott Kelso, he became assistant professor (tenure track 1999) and then associate professor (tenure, 2004) in physics and complex systems and brain sciences at Florida Atlantic University, US. In 2006 he accepted a senior researcher position as director of research at the Centre National de la Recherche Scientifique (CNRS) in Marseille, France, at the Institut des Sciences du Mouvement UMR6233, CNRS-Aix Marseille Université. 
Together with Patrick Chauvel, he founded in 2012 the Institut de Neurosciences des Systèmes(INS), UMR1106, Inserm – Aix-Marseille University, where he currently serves as its director.

Research and academic contributions

The Virtual Brain (TVB): integrating neuroinformatics tools

In 2005 the consortium Brain Network Recovery Group (NRG) was created and coordinated by Anthony Randal (Randy) McIntosh from Baycrest, Toronto, Canada. Brain NRG is a consortium composed of cognitive, clinical and computational neuroscientists with the common goal of investigating network mechanisms for brain function and dysfunction. Very quickly it became apparent, that the collaboration would need to integrate neuroinformatics tools to allow most hypotheses on brain function to go beyond jargon and become seriously testable and falsifiable. The consortium grant was renewed with the primary goal to create a neuroinformatics platform for the modelling of realistic connectome-based brain network models of individual human subjects. The platform was named The Virtual Brain (TVB) and placed under the scientific lead of Jirsa. Jochen Mersmann was the chief architect of the software architecture and Petra Ritter joined in 2011 as TVB Applications leader. A first prototype was launched in October 2012 and is regularly maintained and updated since then. TVB has created its own community and comprised more than 10000 registered TVB users in January 2018 with regular training workshops, exhibits and symposia at international conferences.

The Virtual Brain is a free open source neuroinformatics tool designed to aid in the exploration of network mechanisms of brain function and associated pathologies. TVB provides the possibility to feed computational neuronal network models with information about structural and functional imaging data including population (sEEG/EEG/MEG) activity, spatially highly resolved whole brain metabolic/vascular signals (fMRI) and global measures of neuronal connections (DTI) – for intact as well as pathologically altered connectivity. TVB is model agnostic and offers a wide range of neural population models to be used as network nodes. The software infrastructure of the Virtual Brain is composed of a functional core running the large-scale brain simulations independently or in batch mode, a web based interface to access the simulator, as well as a command line interface to develop more extensive applications. All simulations may be performed on workstations and laptops, as well as on high-performance clusters (HPCs). Manipulations of network parameters within the Virtual Brain allow researchers and clinicians to test the effects of experimental paradigms, interventions (such as stimulation and surgery) and therapeutic strategies (such as pharmaceutical interventions targeting local areas). The computational environment allows the user to visualise the simulated data in 2D and 3D and perform data analyses in the same way as commonly performed with empirical data.

See Jirsa’s Keynote lecture on TVB on:

Connectome-based brain models: modelling large networks realistically

Full brain modelling of the last century was limited to either a few regions of interest modelling or to (mostly unrealistic) approximations of brain connectivity. However, full brain models have always been the interface between human brain imaging and theorising on brain function and dysfunction. In 2002 Jirsa and colleagues demonstrated that the approximations of brain connectivity will never be able to capture most behaviour of brain imaging data (in particular the spatiotemporal symmetries in the data) and thus proposed to use DTI data as a proxy of network connectivity in brain models. Characteristic challenges for this type of large-scale models would be 1) the detailed connection topology and 2) time delays via signal transmission, which do not play a role for modelling on all other levels of organisation. In 2006 Jirsa introduced connectome-based connectivity (from the Cocamac data base with the help of Rolf Kötter) and presented a large-scale brain network model of resting state brain dynamics in Sendai, Japan, at the Brain Connectivity workshop. Connectome-based brain modelling became an active field of research in the years that followed (Honey et al. 2007; Ghosh et al. 2008; Deco et al. 2009), with many applications devoted to resting state dynamics in healthy subjects, ageing and diseases such as schizophrenia, lesions and epilepsy. Various reviews summarise the findings (Deco et al. 2011, 2013; Kringelbach et al. 2015) and highlight the impact of this new approach. Jirsa and his group have contributed to the conception and development of connectome-based modelling and developed a range of technical tools since the early 2000s (Jirsa & Kelso 2000; Jirsa et al. 2002; Jirsa 2009). Of particular importance are Jirsa’s contributions to a better understanding and treatment of signal transmission time delays in brain networks. The presence of many time delays, which are systematically distributed across the network, is a key characteristic of connectome-based brain models and not encountered in any other system of spatiotemporal pattern formation.

The Epileptor: modelling epilepsy phenomenologically

Epilepsy is defined by the onset and offset of high-frequency discharges. Nonlinear dynamic system theory teaches us that there is only a finite number of ways to start and stop an oscillation. Based on this insight, Jirsa and colleagues (2014) used first principles rooted in mathematics and bifurcation theory to derive a taxonomy of seizures, which identifies 16 classes via their scaling behaviour of amplitude and frequency at seizure onset and offset. A generative canonical model based on ordinary differential equations unambiguously characterises each seizure type and produces biologically realistic seizure dynamics.  More traditional biophysiologically realistic neuronal population models can be mapped upon the seizure taxonomy and thus provides constraints upon their parameters for each seizure type. In particular, some seizure types can be triggered via stimulation and others cannot, which can be deduced from the taxonomy. There is one seizure type, which appears to be predominantly present and invariant across species (zebra fish, mouse, human). The corresponding mathematical model is called Epileptor and comprises two ensembles and a slow permittivity variable. The first ensemble is linked to the generation of fast oscillations, the second ensemble to the interictal spikes and the often-present spike-wave complex close to seizure offset. The slow permittivity variable accounts for, presumably predominantly, extracellular effects related to energy consumption and oxygen and captures details of the autonomous slow evolution of interictal and ictal phases, as well as various details of seizure evolution during each phase. The Epileptor has made a range of predictions that have been successfully experimentally confirmed, including DC-baseline shift at seizure on/offset, epochs of refractoriness for stimulation, routes towards and out of refractory status epilepticus (El Houssaini et al., 2015) and others. The Epileptor since then has inspired various other groups to do research in this field and serves as a network node mode in connectome-based brain network models of epileptic patients.

Karl Friston wrote a commentary highlighting the impact of this work.

Awards and Metrics

Jirsa has been awarded several international and national awards for his research, including the Prime of Scientific Excellence (CNRS, 2011), the Early Career Distinguished Scholar Award by NASPSPA in 2004 and the Francois Erbsmann Prize in 2001. He is invited regularly to major international conferences and has given more than 100 invited lectures, including various keynote addresses and plenary lectures. Jirsa is editor-in-chief of the European Physical Journal (EPJ) Nonlinear Biomedical Physics, serves on various editorial and scientific advisory boards. , he has published more than 190 scientific articles and book chapters with over 9000 citations and an h-index of 50/63 (Scopus/Google Scholar), as well as co-edited several books including the Handbook of Brain Connectivity.

References 

1968 births
Living people
Scientists from Prague
German neuroscientists
21st-century German physicists
University of Stuttgart alumni
Alumni of the University of Manchester
Florida Atlantic University faculty
Research directors of the French National Centre for Scientific Research